The COVID-19 pandemic in Lesotho is part of the ongoing worldwide pandemic of coronavirus disease 2019 caused by severe acute respiratory syndrome coronavirus 2. The virus was confirmed to have reached Lesotho on 13 May 2020.

Prior to this, Lesotho was the last country in Africa to have no reported cases of COVID-19 during the global pandemic.

The country did not have the ability to test for the virus, and so, in order to prevent the spread of the virus the government closed its border with South Africa. On 18 March, the government declared a national emergency despite having no confirmed cases, and closed schools until 17 April, but allowed school meals to continue. Arriving travellers were to be quarantined for 14 days upon arrival. Prime Minister Thomas Thabane announced a three-week lock down from midnight 29 March. Lesotho began sending its samples to South Africa's National Institute for Communicable Diseases for testing.

Recorded cases started to increase rapidly in 2021, with revelations that the government had released COVID-19-positive people from quarantine early, as well as cases attributed to workers travelling home from South Africa. On 8 January, South African border authorities estimated that more than 100 Lesotho arrivals a day were testing positive.

Timeline

May 2020
 Lesotho began lifting some aspects of the lockdown from 5 May.
 Lesotho confirmed its first case on 13 May and its second case on 22 May.
 At the end of May, one of the two confirmed cases was still active.

June 2020
 Two additional cases were reported on the 3 June.  Both had travelled from Cape Town .
 On 22 June, eight additional cases were reported, seven of whom had travelled from South Africa, and one from Zimbabwe.
 During June there were 25 confirmed cases, bringing the total number of confirmed cases to 27. Three patients recovered in June, raising the total number of recovered patients to 4. The remaining 23 cases were still active at the end of June. Model-based simulations indicate that the 95% confidence interval for the time-varying reproduction number Rt was around 2.0 in June.

July to September 2020
 The country recorded its first death on 9 July, by which time confirmed cases had climbed to 134. By the end of the month the number of confirmed cases had climbed to 604 and the death toll to 13. The number of recovered patients increased to 144, leaving 447 active cases at the end of the month.
 There were 481 new cases in August, raising the total number of confirmed cases to 1085. The death toll increased by 18 to 31. There were 526 active cases at the end of the month: 18% more than at the end of July.
 There were 480 new cases in September, bringing the total number of confirmed cases to 1565. The death toll rose to 35. The number of recovered patients increased to 822, leaving 708 active cases at the end of the month.

October to December 2020
 There were 388 new cases in October, bringing the total number of confirmed cases to 1953. The death toll rose to 44. The number of recovered patients increased to 975, leaving 934 active cases at the end of the month.
 There were 156 new cases in November, bringing the total number of confirmed cases to 2109. The death toll remained unchanged. The number of recovered patients increased to 1278, leaving 787 active cases at the end of the month.
 There were 1097 new cases in December, taking the total number of confirmed cases to 3206. The death toll rose to 51. The number of recovered patients increased to 1496, leaving 1659 active cases at the end of the month.

January to March 2021
 There were 5458 new cases in January, raising the total number of confirmed cases to 8664. The death toll rose to 172. The number of recovered patients increased to 2552, leaving 5940 active cases at the end of the month.
 There were 1827 new cases in February, taking the total number of confirmed cases to 10491. The death toll rose to 292. The number of recovered patients increased to 3745, leaving 6454 active cases at the end of the month.
 Vaccinations started on 10 March. There were 215 new cases in March, taking the total number of confirmed cases to 10706. The death toll rose to 315. The number of recovered patients increased to 4471, leaving 5920 active cases at the end of the month.

April to June 2021
 There were 25 new cases in April, taking the total number of confirmed cases to 10731. The death toll rose to 316. The number of recovered patients increased to 6267, leaving 4148 active cases at the end of the month.
 There were 100 new cases in May, taking the total number of confirmed cases to 10831. The death toll rose to 326. The number of recovered patients increased to 6434, leaving 4071 active cases at the end of the month.
 There were 585 new cases in June, taking the total number of confirmed cases to 11416. The death toll rose to 329. The number of recovered patients increased to 6451, leaving 4630 active cases at the end of the month.

July to September 2021
 There were 2187 new cases in July, raising the total number of confirmed cases to 13603. The death toll rose to 377. The number of recovered patients increased to 6664, leaving 6562 active cases at the end of the month.
 There were 792 new cases in August, bringing the total number of confirmed cases to 14395. The death toll rose to 403. The number of recovered patients increased to 6830, leaving 7162 active cases at the end of the month.
 There were 6867 new cases in September, bringing the total number of confirmed cases to 21262. The death toll rose to 632. The number of recovered patients increased to 11443, leaving 9187 active cases at the end of the month.

October to December 2021
 There were 373 new cases in October, bringing the total number of confirmed cases to 21635. The death toll rose to 658. The number of recovered patients increased to 12485, leaving 8492 active cases at the end of the month.
 There were 172 new cases in November, bringing the total number of confirmed cases to 21807. The death toll rose to 663. The number of recovered patients increased to 13707, leaving 7437 active cases at the end of the month.
 There were 7845 new cases in December, raising the total number of confirmed cases to 29652. The death toll rose to 671. The number of recovered patients increased to 15822, leaving 13159 active cases at the end of the month. Modeling carried out by WHO's Regional Office for Africa suggests that due to under-reporting, the true cumulative number of infections by the end of 2021 was around 0.98 million while the true number of COVID-19 deaths was around 700.

January to March 2022
 There were 2606 new cases in January, raising the total number of confirmed cases to 32258. The death toll rose to 694. The number of recovered patients increased to 22054, leaving 9510 active cases at the end of the month.
 There were 449 new cases in February, bringing the total number of confirmed cases to 32707. The death toll rose to 697. The number of recovered patients increased to 23437, leaving 8573 active cases at the end of the month.
 There were 203 new cases in March, bringing the total number of confirmed cases to 32910. The death toll remained unchanged. The number of recovered patients increased to 24155, leaving 8058 active cases at the end of the month.

April to June 2022
 There were 227 new cases in April, taking the total number of confirmed cases to 33137. The death toll remained unchanged. The number of recovered patients increased to 24642, leaving 7798 active cases at the end of the month.
 There were 425 new cases in May, taking the total number of confirmed cases to 33562. The death toll rose to 699.
 There were 471 new cases in June, taking the total number of confirmed cases to 34033. The death toll rose to 700.

July to December 2022
 By the end of August there had been 34206 confirmed cases and 704 deaths. The number of recovered patients increased to 33502, leaving no active cases at the end of the month.
 There were 371 new cases in September, bringing the number of confirmed cases to 34577. The death toll rose to 706.
 By the end of November there had been 35008 confirmed cases and 707 deaths.
 By the end of 2022 there had been 35147 confirmed cases and 709 deaths.

Statistics

Confirmed new cases per day

Confirmed deaths per day

See also 
 COVID-19 pandemic in Africa
 COVID-19 pandemic by country and territory

References

External links 
Kingdom of Lesotho - COVID-19 Page
https://ewn.co.za/2020/03/19/lesotho-declares-national-emergency-over-covid-19-outbreak
https://www.iol.co.za/the-star/news/covid-19-lesotho-seals-borders-amid-infection-fears-while-sa-tourism-suffers-44770854
https://ewn.co.za/2020/04/15/covid-19-exclusive-lesotho-s-majoro-pleads-with-basotho-not-to-return-home
http://www.rfi.fr/en/africa/20200418-lesotho-pm-thabane-deploys-army-onto-streets-to-restore-peace-order-coronavirus-lockdown-coup-covid-19
 https://www.aljazeera.com/news/2020/04/fire-lesotho-pm-deploys-army-streets-restore-order-200418122720308.html
 https://www.aljazeera.com/news/2020/04/murder-power-army-streets-lesotho-deepening-crisis-200424131303053.html
 https://www.lowyinstitute.org/the-interpreter/why-15-countries-still-haven-t-reported-any-cases-covid-19
 https://www.gov.uk/foreign-travel-advice/lesotho/coronavirus

Lesotho
Coronavirus pandemic
Coronavirus pandemic
Lesotho
Disease outbreaks in Lesotho